Scopula macrocelis is a moth of the  family Geometridae. It is found in the Republic of Congo and Cameroon.

References

Moths described in 1915
macrocelis
Insects of Cameroon
Fauna of the Republic of the Congo
Moths of Africa